St. Edward's University is a private, Catholic university in Austin, Texas. It was founded and is operated in the Holy Cross tradition.

History

Founding and early history
St. Edward's University was founded by the Reverend Edward Sorin, CSC, Superior General of the Congregation of Holy Cross, who also founded the University of Notre Dame in Notre Dame, Indiana. Father Sorin established the institution on farmland south of Austin in 1877 and named it St. Edward's Academy in honor of his patron saint, Edward the Confessor and King. The high school section later separated to become St. Edward's High School but closed during the 1970s. It is affiliated with the Congregation of Holy Cross.

In 1885, the president, Rev. P.J. Franciscus, strengthened the prestige of the academy by securing a charter, changing its name to St. Edward's College, assembling a faculty and increasing enrollment. Subsequently, St. Edward's began to grow, and the first school newspaper, the organization of baseball and football teams, and approval to erect an administration building all followed. Architect Nicholas J. Clayton of Galveston, Texas was commissioned to design the college's Main Building. The structure was built four stories tall in the Gothic Revival style and was constructed with local white limestone.

Twentieth century
In 1903, a fire destroyed the majority of Main Building, but it was rebuilt by the fall. In 1922, Main Building sustained damage from a tornado that caused significant damage all over the campus. Main Building was added to the National Register of Historic Places in 1973. In 1925, St. Edward's received its university charter. Most of the personnel at the time were Holy Cross priests and brothers. Women arrived at St. Edward's in 1966 as students for Maryhill College, a coordinate institution. By 1970, Maryhill was absorbed and St. Edward's became co-educational.

By 1971, the university carried bachelor's and master's degrees in business administration. Also added were the College Assistance Migrant Program, or CAMP (1972); a professionally oriented Theater Arts curriculum (1972); an innovative degree program for adults called New College (1974); and Freshman Studies (1975). In 1984, Patricia Hayes became the second layperson to lead St. Edward's University.  In 1990, enrollment reached 3,000 for the first time. This decade also ushered in civic initiatives and capital improvements.

St. Edward's endowment, as of 2015, stood at more than $92.4 million.

Expansion (1999present)
George E. Martin, PhD, served as the institution’s 23rd president. From Fall 1999–Summer 2021, Dr. Martin oversaw a period of expansion for St. Edward’s that included transforming the campus through the construction of many new buildings, doubling enrollment, growing the endowment, building global partnerships and founding the Holy Cross Institute  to sustain the mission of the Brothers of the Congregation of Holy Cross. In February 2022, Dr. Montserrat ‘Montse’ Fuentes was inaugurated as the 24th president and first Hispanic president of St. Edward’s University. As part of her presidential inaugural address, Dr. Fuentes unveiled the university’s Strategic Plan 2027,  a roadmap that articulates how St. Edward’s will continue its mission  of serving as a destination university known for academic distinction, inclusive excellence and a commitment to social justice.

New buildings and renovations
From 2015 to 2017, the university focused its efforts on preparing students for the demands of accelerating technological, economic and cultural changes. More partnerships within the Austin business community and with other colleges were developed to expand avenues for real-world learning, research and degree programs. The Campaign for St. Edward's University ended in 2017, topping $100 million in donations and raising the endowment to $110 million. The conclusion of the 1999 campus master plan achieved more than $300 million in campus and technology improvements.

Trustee Hall, a  academic facility, opened in fall 2002. In 2003, Basil Moreau Hall, a co-ed freshmen residence hall opened. The John Brooks Williams Natural Sciences Center–North facility that opened in fall 2006, was the first of a two-building science complex and houses the biology and chemistry programs in the School of Natural Sciences. The John Brooks Williams Natural Sciences Center–South opened in fall 2013. It houses the computer science, mathematics and physics programs, and features 13 classrooms, advanced computer and math labs, and a 126-seat auditorium.

A 756-car parking garage opened in 2007. Major renovations of existing campus buildings include Premont Hall (2006), Fleck Hall (2007) and Doyle Hall (2009). A new residential village opened in 2009. A renovated campus library, formerly the Scarborough-Phillips Library, opened in fall 2013 as The Munday Library. The library features global digital classrooms for video conferencing, revamped reading, study and meeting spaces, an expanded digital collection, and writing and media centers. The library renovation was funded in 2011 by a $13 million donation from Bill and Pat Munday. The Mundays also donated $20 million for university scholarships in 2013. Both donations were school records.

Academics

St. Edward's offers 8 master's degree programs and bachelor's degrees in more than 50 areas of study through the schools of Behavioral and Social Sciences, Education, Humanities, Natural Sciences and The Bill Munday School of Business. For 2022, U.S. News & World Report ranked St. Edward's #9 in Regional Universities West, #3 in Best Colleges for Veterans, and #10 in Best Undergraduate Teaching.

Theater 
St. Edward's has a Theater Arts program, featuring a U/RTA contract with the Actors' Equity Association, allowing students who successfully complete the requirements of a Membership Candidate Program to become eligible to join Actors' Equity Association. In 2005, actor and environmentalist Ed Begley, Jr. brought his play, César & Ruben, to St. Edward's University for its Texas premiere.

Campus in France
In September 2008, St. Edward's started a portal campus in Angers, France to provide educational opportunities for European and American students. Faculty members at St. Edward's travel to Angers each semester to teach courses.

The St. Edward's in Angers, France program is in partnership with the Catholic University of the West.

Student life
As of fall 2018, undergraduate enrollment was 4,301 with a student body that was 62% female and 38% male.  The percentage of applicants admitted in fall 2018 was 86%, with 17% of those admitted choosing to enroll.

More than 1,300 students live on campus in seven residence halls and two apartment communities. Students at St. Edward's University are also involved in more than 125 campus organizations, including student government, service organizations, academic honor societies, cultural clubs and intramural sports. 28 languages and 40 faith traditions are represented on campus.

Hilltop Views
Hilltop Views is the student newspaper published by the School of Humanities at the university. The print edition is available Wednesdays on newsstands across campus during the academic year, and can be accessed online. The newspaper has been printed since 1987.

Topper Radio
In the fall semester of 2012, two freshmen students founded St. Edward's University's radio station, Topper Radio, which operates exclusively online. The media organization launched its official broadcast in September 2013 on Live365, the largest internet radio host in the world. In October through December, Topper Radio was acknowledged for its #1 rank in Live365's "Non-Commercial College Radio" category and #10 rank in "College Radio" overall.

Athletics

St. Edward's NCAA Division II varsity athletic teams, known as the Hilltoppers, include men's and women's baseball/softball, basketball, golf, soccer, track & field, cross country and tennis. Women also compete in Division II volleyball. St. Edward's was a founding member of the Heartland Conference. St. Edward's left the Heartland to join the Lone Star Conference in 2019.

As of Fall 2014, the Hilltopper varsity athletic teams made 28 NCAA Tournament appearances over the last five seasons. Since joining the NCAA in 1999, the Hilltopper teams have won 55 Heartland Conference Championships.

In 2008–09, five St. Edward's athletes were named All-American, and 56 individuals were named to the All-Heartland Conference Team. St. Edward's men's soccer team was the Heartland Conference Champions in 2009. The women's soccer team has been very successful since 2006, posting winning records each season, and being selected to the NCAA Tournament 6 out of 7 years.

In April 2020, St. Edward's abruptly discontinued five NCAA Division II programs: men's and women's golf, men's and women's tennis and men's soccer, while also downgrading its cheer squad to a club sport.

Residences
The following residence halls serve the university:
 Jacques Dujarié Hall (Opened August 2005, coeducational)
 East Hall (Opened 1966) – East served as a female-only hall and a coeducational hall.
 Basil Moreau Hall (Opened February 2003, coeducational)
 Teresa Hall (Opened 1968, renovated 1999, coeducational) – Teresa served as a female-only hall and a coeducational hall.
The Casa and two Casitas, for upperclassmen, serve as "house-style living." The Casa residents use the facilities of Dujarié Hall.
The residential village, which is made up of three residence halls, (Hunt, LeMans, and Lady Bird Johnson halls) opened for residents at the start of the Spring 2009 semester, housing freshmen in suite-style rooms in Hunt and Le Mans, as well as upperclassmen in LBJ's single rooms. St. Edward's maintains two apartment communities, Maryhill Apartments (Buildings 1–11) and Hilltopper Heights Apartments (Buildings 12–17) for students.
The St. André Apartments, previously the Pavilions, is a condo-style apartment complex for upperclassmen. It houses 446 students and offers fully furnished rooms and a kitchen in every apartment. The complex was scheduled to open in autumn of 2017, but the opening was delayed by a year. Students were housed in multiple hotels and shuttled to school. Students moved into the apartments in autumn of 2018 but were evacuated that November due to flooding from a burst pipe. In 2020 the complex was renamed the St. André Apartments.

Notable alumni
 Joe Aillet - Head football coach at Louisiana Tech University, 1940-1966
 Dennis Bonnen (Class of 1994, Bachelor of Arts in Political science) – former Speaker (2019–21) and member of the Texas House of Representatives from Brazoria County, 1997-2021
 Charles Robert Borchers (Class of 1963), district attorney of the 49th Judicial District Court 1973–1980
 George Edward Cire – former US District Court judge
 Salam Fayyad – Palestinian Prime Minister 2007 of the Emergency Government
 Luci Baines Johnson – chairman of the Board, LBJ Asset Management Partners, daughter of US President Lyndon B. Johnson
 Abdul Karim al-Kabariti – Jordanian, Prime Minister of Jordan from 1996 to 1997
 Khalid bin Ahmed Al Khalifa – Bahraini Minister of Foreign Affairs
 Bill Killefer – former Major League baseball player
 Gabriel Luna - American actor
 Patrick Mason (economist) - Professor of Economics and African-American Studies
 Taj McWilliams – Connecticut Sun forward/center
 Roger Metzger – former Houston Astros Shortstop and 1973 Gold Glove Winner
 Monsignor William Mulvey – Bishop of Corpus Christi
 Timothy Ogene – poet, novelist, and lecturer at Harvard.
 Bull Polisky – American football player
 Jorge Quiroga – former President of Bolivia
 Silvestre Revueltas – Mexican composer, attended in 1917 and 1918
 Charles M. Robinson III – author and illustrator
 Charles Rogers – film director and screenwriter
 Mike Rosenthal (born 1977) - NFL offensive tackle
 Tim Russ - actor
 Fermín Revueltas Sánchez – painter
 Mel Stuessy – American football player
 John Andrew Young – former U.S. Representative from Texas
 Brandon Maxwell - Fashion Designer

Notable faculty
Mark Cherry
Joe Doerr
Carrie Fountain
Hollis Hammonds 
Eamonn Healy
Paula Mitchell Marks

Gallery

References

External links
 Map: 

 Official website
 

 
Holy Cross universities and colleges
Universities and colleges in Austin, Texas
National Register of Historic Places in Austin, Texas
Buildings and structures in Austin, Texas
1877 establishments in Texas
Universities and colleges accredited by the Southern Association of Colleges and Schools
Catholic universities and colleges in Texas
Association of Catholic Colleges and Universities
University and college buildings on the National Register of Historic Places in Texas